Right Yaaa Wrong is a 2010 Indian Hindi-language crime thriller film directed by Neeraj Pathak, starring Sunny Deol and Irrfan Khan in the lead roles. The film is based on the lives of two  police officers of India, who later become strong rivals. It also stars Konkona Sen Sharma, Isha Koppikar, Aryan Vaid and Govind Namdeo. This film was shot in Film City and released on 12 March 2010, under the banner of Eros. The film is based on the 1995 Hollywood film Above Suspicion

Plot
Right Yaaa Wrong is a story of two cops, Ajay (Sunny Deol) and Vinay (Irrfan Khan), where an intense rivalry leads them on a battle for supremacy.

Ajay and Vinay are best friends. Ajay's wife (Isha Koppikar) is found brutally murdered. Ajay is the prime suspect and Vinay is handed the case. Unsure what to do, either help his best friend or achieve a higher position in his job, Vinay goes against Ajay. By this time, Radhika (Konkana Sen Sharma), Vinay's younger sister takes up Ajay's case as his lawyer, and is Ajay's only support.

The investigation transpires into a mystery locked with secrets. Behind the secrets lies an astonishing discovery. Ripples begin with wits and mind games. Every time hatching a clue, Vinay tries to beat Ajay, but gets beaten when Ajay has a reply to all of his questions. This is the story of a strong friendship. When Vinay is ready to throw in the towel and admit defeat the truth is finally revealed. Ajay can walk and murdered his wife for being unfaithful. He had killed both her and her lover. But with no evidence to proof Ajay’s guilt. Ajay boards a plane to go abroad whereby he leaves a written note telling Vinay that he was right.

Cast
 Sunny Deol as ACP Ajay Shridhar
 Irrfan Khan as Inspector Vinay Patnaik
 Konkona Sen Sharma as Radhika Patnaik
 Isha Koppikar as Anshita 'Anshu' Sridhar
 Aryan Vaid as Boris
 Arav Chowdhary as Sanjay Sridhar
 Master Ali Haji as Yash A. Sridhar
 Deepal Shaw as Inspector Shalini Chawla
 Govind Namdeo as a Public Prosecutor Nigam
 Suhasini Mulay as a Judge
 Kamlesh Sawant as Sawant
 Ali Khan as Mr. Dacosta
 Parikshat Sahni as a Doctor
 Nilanjana Bhattacharya
 Surendra Rajan as a Security Guard
 Shillpi Sharma in a Special Appearance
 Vijay Patkar as Police Inspector
Satish Kashyap as Police Inspector
Saidah Jules

Critical reception
The film have received mixed reviews from critics. Mayank Shekhar of Hindustan Times and Rajeev Masand of IBN have panned the movie, while Nikhat Khazmi of Times of India and Taran Adarsh of DNA rated it below average. The film received an overall rating of 5/10.

References

As per Box Office India the film was a Disaster . It grossed only 3.12 Core. The First Week occupancy was only 25% .1st week collection

External links
 
 Right Yaa Wrong Reviews - ReviewGang

2010s Hindi-language films
2010 films
Indian crime drama films
Indian crime thriller films